Lauren Elizabeth Lappin (born June 26, 1984) is an American former collegiate All-American and medal-winning Olympian, professional All-Star softball player and current assistant coach for Arizona. She played college softball at Stanford and led them to a semifinal finish at the 2004 Women's College World Series. She later represented the United States women's national softball team at the 2008 Summer Olympics and won a silver medal. She then played in the National Pro Fastpitch from 2010 to 2014, winning two Cowles Cup championships with the USSSA Pride.

Playing career
Lappin attended Stanford University from 2002 to 2006 playing shortstop and catcher for the softball team and graduated in December 2006 with a degree in American Studies.

She also played with the USA National Elite Team in 2003 and 2005 and was an alternate for the US Olympic Team in 2004. In the 2008 games, Lappin played in three of Team USA's matches and had a hit and drove in two runs.

Prior to the 2009 season, Lappin joined the Northwestern University team as a volunteer coach.

In 2010, Lappin joined National Pro Fastpitch for the USSSA Pride. She was traded to the Pennsylvania Rebellion in 2014 before retiring in March 2015.

On March 20th 2023, Lappin became the first number retired by the Loara High School softball team.

Personal life
Lappin is openly lesbian.

Coaching career
On June 22, 2021, Lappin was named assistant coach for Arizona.

Statistics

References

External links
 
 

1984 births
Living people
Softball players from California
Lesbian sportswomen
LGBT people from California
American LGBT sportspeople
Olympic silver medalists for the United States in softball
Olympic softball players of the United States
Sportspeople from Anaheim, California
Softball players at the 2007 Pan American Games
Softball players at the 2008 Summer Olympics
Stanford Cardinal softball players
Medalists at the 2008 Summer Olympics
LGBT softball players
Pan American Games competitors for the United States